Eugénio Eleutério (3 November 1920 – 28 July 2020) was a Portuguese sprinter. He competed in the men's 200 metres at the 1952 Summer Olympics.

References

External links
 

1920 births
2020 deaths
Athletes (track and field) at the 1952 Summer Olympics
Portuguese male sprinters
Olympic athletes of Portugal
Place of birth missing